R. Ramprabhu is an Indian politician and presently serving Member of the Legislative Assembly of Tamil Nadu. He was elected to the Tamil Nadu legislative assembly as a Tamil Maanila Congress (Moopanar) candidate from Paramakudi constituency in 2001 election and as an Indian National Congress candidate in 2006 election.

References 

Indian National Congress politicians from Tamil Nadu
Living people
Year of birth missing (living people)